The 2012–13 Pepperdine Waves women's basketball team represented Pepperdine University in the 2012–13 college basketball season. The Waves, members of the West Coast Conference, were led by head coach Julie Rousseau, in her 9th and final season at the school. The Waves played their home games at the Firestone Fieldhouse on the university campus in Malibu, California. They finished the season 5-23, 2–14 in conference, and were 9th place in the conference standings. They lost in the first round of the WCC Tournament to conclude their season and the coaching career of Rousseau at Pepperdine. Rousseau would resign on April 3, 2013, after compiling a 123–144 record at Pepperdine with 3 NCAA Tournament appearances.

Before the season
The Waves were picked to finish fifth in the WCC Pre-Season poll.

Roster

Schedule

|-
!colspan=9 style="background:#FF6200; color:#0021A5;"| Exhibition

|-
!colspan=9 style="background:#0021A5; color:#FF6200;"| Non-conference Regular Season

|-
!colspan=9 style="background:#0021A5; color:#FF6200;"| WCC Regular Season

|-
!colspan=9 style="background:#FF6200; color:#0021A5;"| 2013 West Coast Conference women's basketball tournament

Rankings

References

Pepperdine
Pepperdine Waves women's basketball seasons
Pepperdine
Pepperdine